Perkins is an unincorporated community in Gilmer County, West Virginia, United States. Perkins had a post office, which closed on November 2, 2002.

The community was named after Clen Boggs (née Perkins), the wife of an early settler.

References

Unincorporated communities in Gilmer County, West Virginia
Unincorporated communities in West Virginia